The CS/LR3 (military designation QBU-141) is a type of bolt-action sniper rifle designed and manufactured by Chinese company Norinco. The weapon is chambered with DBU-141 5.8×42mm high-precision ammunition in a 10-round box magazine. The rifle features a free-floating barrel and specifically designed munition that improves accuracy, whereas China's previous sniper rifles use standard machine gun rounds.

Users
: People's Liberation Army Ground Force

See also
CS/LR4
QBU-88

References

Sniper rifles of the People's Republic of China
5.8 mm firearms
Bolt-action rifles